Caroline Powell may refer to:

 Caroline Powell (equestrian), New Zealand equestrian
 Caroline Powell (athlete), British masters athlete
 Caroline Powell (skier), British skier
 Caroline Amelia Powell, Irish-born American engraver and illustrator